Heather Brandon was the chairman of the World Board of the World Association of Girl Guides and Girl Scouts (WAGGGS), from 1996 - 1999. For her work, she received the OB-PS certificate and insignia at the WAGGGS conference in July, 2008. In addition to working as Chief Executive to a number of not for profits, she was also Director of The Global Fund for Children UK Trust, a grant making organisation that helps provide opportunities to vulnerable children.  Brandon is a qualified executive coach and training expert in motivational team building and social diversity. She has been influential in youth education, international development and social entrepreneurship.

In 2009, Heather Brandon co-founded UnLtd South Africa with fellow trustee Kathy Watters based on the successful model from UnLtd in the UK to support social entrepreneurs in South Africa.

Education 

Brandon graduated from the University of Witwatersrand with a Bachelor of Arts degree and holds a postgraduate diploma in Executive Coaching from the University of Strathclyde.

References 

Living people
Social entrepreneurs
Year of birth missing (living people)
Scouting and Guiding in South Africa
Chairs of the World Board (World Association of Girl Guides and Girl Scouts)